Tiger-style, TigerStyle, Tiger Style, or variant, may refer to:

 Tiger Style Records, record company
 Tiger Kung Fu, Tiger-style of Kung Fu
 Tiger Kuntao, Tiger-style of Kuntao
 Tigerstripe, Tiger-style clothing
 Tiger Style, game company
 Tigerstyle, Scottish band